Saale-Orla-Kreis I is an electoral constituency (German: Wahlkreis) represented in the Landtag of Thuringia. It elects one member via first-past-the-post voting. Under the current constituency numbering system, it is designated as constituency 33. It covers the southern part of Saale-Orla-Kreis.

Saale-Orla-Kreis I was created for the 1994 state election. Since 2019, it has been represented by Uwe Thrum of Alternative for Germany (AfD).

Geography
As of the 2019 state election, Saale-Orla-Kreis I covers the southern part of Saale-Orla-Kreis, specifically the municipalities of Bad Lobenstein, Burgk, Dittersdorf, Dreba, Gefell, Görkwitz, Göschitz, Hirschberg, Kirschkau, Knau, Löhma, Moßbach, Neundorf (at Schleiz), Oettersdorf, Plothen, Pörmitz, Remptendorf, Rosenthal am Rennsteig, Saalburg-Ebersdorf, Schleiz (excluding Crispendorf), Tanna, Tegau, Volkmannsdorf, and Wurzbach.

Members
The constituency was held by the Christian Democratic Union (CDU) from its creation in 1994 until 2019, during which time it was represented by Siegfried Wetzel (1994–2014) and Stefan Gruhner (2014–2019). It was won by Alternative for Germany in 2019, and is represented by Uwe Thrum.

Election results

2019 election

2014 election

2009 election

2004 election

1999 election

1994 election

References

Electoral districts in Thuringia
1994 establishments in Germany
Saale-Orla-Kreis
Constituencies established in 1994